Ashley Gilbertson (born 22 January 1978) is an Australian photographer. He is known for his images of the Iraq War and the effects of the wars in Afghanistan and Iraq on returning veterans and their families. Gilbertson is a member of VII Photo Agency.

In 2004 Gilbertson won the Robert Capa Gold Medal Award from the Overseas Press Club for his photographic reportage on the Battle for Fallujah.

Early life and education
Born in Melbourne, Australia, Gilbertson started his career at thirteen taking pictures of skateboarders. After graduating secondary school, he was mentored by Filipino photographer Emmanuel Santos, and later Masao Endo in the Japanese highlands.

Career
While based in Australia, Gilbertson worked on socially driven photo essays including on drug addiction in Melbourne and war zones in Southeast Asia and the South Pacific. In 1999 he photographed Kosovar refugees in Australia. For the next three years Gilbertson's work focused on refugee issues around the world.

In 2002, Gilbertson travelled to the Kurdish enclave of northern Iraq. Shortly thereafter, President George W. Bush made a case for war in Iraq, and Gilbertson travelled back to cover the story at the beginning of 2003. His work was published widely. In 2004, The New York Times offered Gilberston and their senior writer, Dexter Filkins, an embed with the 1/8 Marines. Gilbertson continued to cover Iraq on contract for The New York Times until 2008. A photographic memoir of his time there entitled Whiskey Tango Foxtrot: A Photographer's Chronicle of the Iraq War was published in 2007.

In March 2009, he became a member of the VII Photo Agency's VII Network, and in 2011 he became a full member.

Gilbertson's book Bedrooms of the Fallen (2014) consists of panoramic black and white photographs of the bedrooms left behind by 40 U.S., Canadian, and European servicemen and women—the number of soldiers in a platoon.

Publications
 21 Days to Baghdad: Photos and Dispatches from the Battlefield. Time, 2003. .
 Witness Iraq: A War Journal. PowerHouse, 2003.
 Beautiful Suffering: Photography and the Traffic in Pain. University of Chicago Press, 2006.
 Whiskey Tango Foxtrot: A Photographer's Chronicle of the Iraq War. University of Chicago Press, 2007. .
 Bedrooms of the Fallen. University of Chicago Press, 2014. . With a foreword by Philip Gourevitch.

Awards

 2001 – Leica/CCP Documentary Award (Melbourne)
One of his images from the invasion of Iraq was included in Time magazine's 'Pictures of the Year'.
 2004 – Included in Photo District News '30 under 30'
 2004 – Publisher's Award, The New York Times
 2004 – Robert Capa Gold Medal, Overseas Press Club (New York) (winner)
 2004 – Photographer of the Year, National Photo Awards (Minnesota) (winner)
 2005 – Joop Swart Masterclass, World Press Photo (Amsterdam) (participant)
 2008 – The Staige D. Blackford Prize for Nonfiction
 2009 – Photo District News, Photo Annual
 2010 – Aaron Siskind Foundation, grant recipient
 2011 – National Magazine Award, Photography, for his series Bedrooms of the Fallen, published as a work in progress in The New York Times Magazine.
 2014 – Photo District News, Photo Annual

References

External links

 
 Website for the book Whiskey Tango Foxtrot including a video interview with Gilbertson
 On The Road article
 Last Photographs with Joanna Gilbertson

1978 births
Living people
Australian photojournalists
War photographers
Photographers from Melbourne
American photojournalists
Photography in Iraq
VII Photo Agency photographers